Deepak Khandekar is an IAS Officer (1985) of Madhya Pradesh Cadre. He is the current Personnel Secretary (India).

Education 
Khandekar is a graduate from National Institute of Technology, Raipur.

References 

Living people
National Institute of Technology, Raipur alumni
Indian government officials
Indian Administrative Service officers
Year of birth missing (living people)